The 1989 Santam Bank Trophy Division A was the third tier of domestic South African rugby, below the two Currie Cup divisions.

Teams

Changes between 1988 and 1989 seasons
  were promoted to the Currie Cup Division B.
  were promoted from Division B.

Changes between 1989 and 1990 seasons
 Divisions A and B merged into one nine-team division.

Competition

Regular season and title play-offs
There were six participating teams in the Santam Bank Trophy Division A. Teams played each other twice over the course of the season, once at home and once away. Teams received two points for a win and one points for a draw. The top two teams in the division – along with the top two teams from Division B qualified for the title play-off finals. The team that finished first in Division A would play at home against the team that finished second in Division B and the team that finished second in Division A would play at home against the team that finished first in Division B.

Promotion play-offs
The Division A champion qualified for the promotion play-offs. That team played off against the team placed sixth in the Currie Cup Division B over two legs. The winner over these two ties qualified for the 1990 Currie Cup Division B, while the losing team qualified for the 1990 Santam Bank Trophy.

Relegation play-offs
The bottom team on the log qualified for the relegation play-offs. That team played off against the team that won the Santam Bank Trophy Division B over two legs. The winner over these two ties qualified for the 1990 Santam Bank Trophy Division A, while the losing team qualified for the 1989 Santam Bank Trophy Division B.

Log

Fixtures and results

Round one

Round two

Round three

Round four

Round five

Round six

Round seven

Round eight

Round nine

Round ten

Round eleven

Round twelve

Santam Bank Trophy finals
The top two teams from Division A and the top two teams from Division B qualified to the trophy finals:

Semi-finals

Final

Promotion/relegation play-offs

Promotion play-offs

Relegation play-offs

See also
 1989 Currie Cup Division A
 1989 Currie Cup Division B
 1989 Santam Bank Trophy Division B
 1989 Lion Cup

References

1989A
1989 Currie Cup